Crowell Little is a former American football and college basketball player. He served as the head football coach at Davidson College in Davidson, North Carolina.
As a college athlete, Little was two-sport star at the University of North Carolina in Chapel Hill, North Carolina from 1936 to 1937.

Head coaching record

References

Year of birth missing
Year of death missing
American football quarterbacks
Davidson Wildcats football coaches
North Carolina Tar Heels football coaches
North Carolina Tar Heels football players
North Carolina Tar Heels men's basketball players